The 2007 French Figure Skating Championships took place between 1 and 2 December 2006 at the Patinoire du Baron in Orléans. Skaters competed at the senior level in the disciplines of men's singles, women's singles, pair skating, ice dancing, and synchronized skating. The event was used to help determine the French team to the 2007 World Championships and the 2007 European Championships.

Results

Men

Ladies

Pairs

Ice dancing

Synchronized

Junior results

Synchronized

External links
 2007 French Championships results
 results

French Championships,2007
French Championships, 2007
2007
2007 in French sport
December 2006 sports events in France